North Head is a community on the island of Grand Manan, New Brunswick. Formerly a separate village, it was amalgamated into the newly formed village of Grand Manan in 1995. North Head is the southern terminus of the Blacks Harbour to Grand Manan Island Ferry.

History

Notable people

 Alison Hawthorne Deming, author, poet, essayist, teacher
Allan Moses (1881 – 1953), naturalist, taxidermist, conservationist

See also
List of communities in New Brunswick
Populated places disestablished in 1995

References

Neighbourhoods in New Brunswick
Former villages in New Brunswick